Gilles Cioni (born 14 June 1984) is a French professional footballer who played as a defender. He spent almost his entire career with hometown club Bastia which he also captained. At international level, he represented the Corsica national team.

Career
In September 2017, Cioni agreed a contract extension with hometown club SC Bastia which had played in Ligue 1 in the 2016–17 season but dropped to the fifth-tier Championnat National 3 after filing bankruptcy.

Cioni announced his retirement from playing in June 2021.

Career statistics

Honours
Bastia
Championnat National: 2010–11
Ligue 2: 2011–12

References

External links
 
 

1984 births
Living people
French footballers
Association football defenders
Corsica international footballers
Ligue 1 players
Ligue 2 players
Championnat National players
Championnat National 2 players
Championnat National 3 players
SC Bastia players
Paris FC players
Footballers from Corsica